Magnus Volk FII (1851–1937) was a British inventor and pioneering electrical engineer.

He is most notable for having built Volk's Electric Railway, the world's oldest operating electric railway.

Career

Aside from the Volk's Electric Railway, he also built the unique, but short lived, Brighton and Rottingdean Seashore Electric Railway, together with its unusual Daddy Long Legs vehicle. He also built another, short-lived line, similar to the VER, in the pleasure grounds at Aston Hall, Birmingham.

In 1887 he attracted attention in Brighton by building a three-wheeled electric carriage powered by an Immisch motor. In 1888 he built another electric car, this time a four-wheeled carriage which was made to the order of the Sultan of the Ottoman Empire, for which he was awarded an Order of Osmali, presented to Magnus by the Sultan in person whilst in Constantinople.

Other projects of Magnus included inventing a fire-alarm system, early successful attempts at electricity in the home, telecommunications and installing electricity to the Royal Pavilion for the first time.

Personal life

Magnus Volk was the son of a German clockmaker and was born on 19 October 1851 in Brighton. He lived at 38 Dyke Road in Brighton. On 8 April 1879, he married Anna Banfield in Burgess Hill. George Herbert Volk, his second son, is noted as a pioneer builder of seaplanes, whilst another son, Conrad Volk, wrote a biography of his father. His Great Grandson is the musician Joe Volk.

Magnus Volk died in Brighton on 20 May 1937, and is buried at St Wulfran's churchyard in Ovingdean near Brighton.

References

Bibliography
 Conrad Volk: Magnus Volk of Brighton. London & Chichester: Phillimore, 1971.

External links

 Magnus Volk in My Brighton and Hove site
  of 'Daddy Longlegs' seashore electric railway

1851 births
1937 deaths
British electrical engineers
British railway civil engineers
British railway pioneers
People from Brighton